This is a list of notable mosques and Islamic centres in the Americas, meaning individual buildings and congregations and administration, including notable current and former examples. This list is sorted alphabetically by country and building name.

See also 

 Lists of mosques
 List of mosques in Brazil
 List of mosques in the United States
 List of mosques in Canada
 List of the oldest mosques in the world

References 

Americas-related lists
Americas
Mosques in North America
Mosques in South America